Dewey William "Snorter" Luster (February 1, 1899 – October 13, 1980) was an American football player and coach.  He served as the head football coach at Southwestern State Teachers College—now Southwestern Oklahoma State University—in 1925 and at the University of Oklahoma from 1941 to 1945, compiling a career college football coaching record of 32–22–4.  Luster was also a player on the Oklahoma Sooners football team from 1917 to 1920 under head coach Bennie Owen and was the captain of the 1920 undefeated team.

Luster was born in Tahlequah, capital of the Cherokee Nation, the son of Otis V. and Callie (Bates) Luster.  His father was a merchant and later a newspaper editor in Pauls Valley.

Luster was the head football coach at Norman High School in Norman, Oklahoma in 1924.  The following year, he succeeded Carl M. Voyles as the head football coach at Southwestern State Teachers College.

Luster's tenure as head coach at Oklahoma was complicated by World War II. In the six months after the attack on Pearl Harbor, nearly 60 Sooner athletes in all sports had enlisted in some branch of the armed services and more continued to enlist as the war progressed.  Luster resigned as head coach almost immediately after his Sooner team lost 47–0 to Oklahoma A&M on November 24, 1945. His official reason for his resignation was "poor health."

Head coaching record

References

1899 births
1980 deaths
American football quarterbacks
Colorado Mines Orediggers football coaches
Oklahoma Sooners football coaches
Oklahoma Sooners football players
Oklahoma Sooners wrestling coaches
Southwestern Oklahoma State Bulldogs football coaches
High school football coaches in Oklahoma
People from Chickasha, Oklahoma
People from Tahlequah, Oklahoma
Coaches of American football from Oklahoma
Players of American football from Oklahoma